"The Chaperone" is the 87th episode of NBC sitcom Seinfeld. This was the first episode for the sixth season. It aired on September 22, 1994. This is the first episode to be directed by Andy Ackerman. In this episode Jerry's efforts to date Miss Rhode Island of the Miss America competition are frustrated by Kramer's insinuating himself as her personal coach, and Elaine takes a job as Justin Pitt's personal assistant.

Plot
Responding to player complaints that they feel hot in their uniforms, George convinces Yankees manager Buck Showalter to replace polyester with cotton as the material for the team's uniforms. The players are enthusiastic about the new uniforms and show noticeably improved performance in games.

At that day's Yankees game, Jerry meets Karen, who is competing in the Miss America pageant as Miss Rhode Island. According to contest rules, she must be chaperoned on her date with Jerry; when her regular chaperone is unavailable, Kramer fills in. Throughout the date Kramer relentlessly quizzes her and makes derogatory suggestions such as that she wear a waist cincher for the competition, giving Jerry no chance to enjoy her company. Karen is impressed by Kramer and asks him to become her personal coach.

Elaine seeks to follow in the footsteps of Jacqueline Kennedy Onassis in securing a position with Doubleday. She sits for an interview with Ms. Landis, which goes poorly. As she is leaving, Elaine is introduced to Justin Pitt. She reminds him of Onassis, so he offers her a job as his personal assistant. Mr. Pitt proves demanding, picky, and impossible to please. Elaine must turn down an invitation to go to Atlantic City with Jerry, who is doing a show there, in order to buy new socks for Pitt.

At the hotel in Atlantic City, George and Jerry are disturbed late at night by the sound of birds; Jerry tries to scare them off by pouring a bucket of water over the balcony, with apparent success. The birds turn out to have been Karen's trained doves, which were being kept in a cage on the terrace of her room on the floor below. The birds are killed by the water, leaving a distraught Karen without a talent routine for the pageant. When Kramer visits Jerry to tell him the news, he spots the empty ice bucket and assumes Jerry sabotaged Karen's place in the contest out of jealousy. Kramer encourages Karen to sing a song in lieu of her magic act with the doves, but as she has never sung before, her performance at the pageant is a disaster. Back at the hotel, Jerry and George flip over to the Yankees game and see the team is playing horribly because their cotton uniforms have shrunk.

Production
Andy Ackerman made his Seinfeld debut with this episode, coming on when the show was already an established success. He recalled being in awe of the show's creators and feeling "like a kid in a candy store." The episode also introduced the character of Justin Pitt, Elaine's new employer. Though he was originally intended as a one-off character, and the episode implies that Elaine will quit or be fired following the end, after production was finished Larry David asked Julia Louis-Dreyfus (the actress playing Elaine) how she felt about Pitt being Elaine's employer for the long term.

The show originated as a script by Bill Masters and Bob Shaw called "The Birds"; Larry David wrote a second draft of the story, which was used as the shooting script.

The locker room scenes were filmed at Angel Stadium in Anaheim, California during late July 1994, when the New York Yankees were actually in town for a series against the then-California Angels. A studio set populated with numerous extras served as Yankee Stadium.

References

 Sony Pictures (2012). "Seinfeld's Episode guide: The Chaperone"

External links 
 

Seinfeld (season 6) episodes
1994 American television episodes
Television episodes written by Larry David
Television episodes about beauty pageants
Miss America